is a Japanese drama series that first aired on NHK in 1979. It is based on Kuniko Mukōda's novel of the same title.

Ken Ogata played the role of Satomi Takao in Part 1 and Shigeru Tsuyuguchi played the role in part 2.

Cast
 Kaoru Yachigusa as Satomi Makiko
 Haruko Kato as Mitamura Tsunako
 Ken Ogata(Part1) / Shigeru Tsuyuguchi(Part2) as Satomi Takao
 Ayumi Ishida as Takezawa Takoko
 Jun Fubuki as Takezawa Sakiko
 Ryudo Uzaki as Katsumata Shizuo
 Shin Saburi as Kotaro Takezawa
 Sanshō Shinsui as Jinnai Hidemitsu
 Ittoku Kishibe(Part2) as Takuma

Episodes

Part1
1, Onna Shougatsu (January 13, 1979)
2, Sando Mame (January 20, 1979)
3, Soubijinsou (January 27, 1979)

Part2
1, Hana Ikusa (January 19, 1980)
2, Ura Kimon (January 26, 1980)
3, Jyaran (February 2, 1980)
4, Otafuku (February 9, 1980)

References

1979 Japanese television series debuts
Japanese drama television series